Cyperus lucidus is a species of sedge that is native to Australia and New Guinea.

The species was first formally described by the botanist Robert Brown in 1810.

See also
 List of Cyperus species

References

lucidus
Taxa named by Robert Brown (botanist, born 1773)
Plants described in 1810
Flora of New South Wales
Flora of Queensland
Flora of Victoria (Australia)
Flora of Tasmania
Flora of South Australia
Flora of New Guinea
Flora of Norfolk Island
Flora of Lord Howe Island